Sterling College is a private evangelical Christian college in Sterling, Kansas. It is accredited by the Higher Learning Commission.

History
The college was founded in 1887 by the Synod of Kansas of the United Presbyterian Church of North America as Cooper Memorial College. It changed its name to Sterling in 1920. When the Presbyterian Church (USA) came into existence in 1958, the newly formed Presbyterian Synod of Kansas considered combining Sterling and the College of Emporia.

Sterling College launched , its online program, in 2007 in hopes of bringing its message to a larger audience. Students can now complete portions of their bachelor's degree online. Sterling College's online program is now called Sterling College Online.

Campus

The 1887 Cooper Hall building is a centerpiece of the campus. It was added to the National Register of Historic Places in 1974 (NRHP# 74000845). Cooper Hall underwent a large renovation and after being closed, was reopened in 2003.

Athletics

The Sterling athletic teams are called the Warriors. The college is a member of the National Association of Intercollegiate Athletics (NAIA), primarily competing in the Kansas Collegiate Athletic Conference (KCAC) since the 1958–59 academic year; which they were a member on a previous stint from 1902–03 to December 1928 (of the 1928–29 school year). They are also a member of the National Christian College Athletic Association (NCCAA), primarily competing as an independent in the Central Region of the Division I level. 

Sterling competes in 23 intercollegiate varsity sports: Men's sports include baseball, basketball, cross country, football, golf, powerlifting, soccer, swimming, tennis and track & field (indoor and outdoor); while women's sports include basketball, cross country, golf, powerlifting, soccer, softball, swimming, tennis, track & field (indoor and outdoor) and volleyball; and co-ed sports include cheerleading.

Student organizations
 Honor societies: Alpha Chi
 Religious organizations: Fellowship of Christian Athletes, CSA (Catholic students), Raya 327 (missions club).
 General organizations: Student Government Association (SGA), Pi Kappa Delta (oldest organization on campus), Behavioral Science Club, Habitat for Humanity, AMP (History Majors Club), Campus Activity Board, Future Science Professionals of America, Residence Hall Councils, Class Officers, Sterling College Athletic Trainers, Musicians at Sterling College, TASC (Theatre Majors Club)
 Media organizations: The Stir (newspaper), Sterling College Online Radio, Sterling College Online Television

Notable people

Faculty 
 Stephen Carls, taught at Sterling College for twelve years

Alumni 
 Brett Fairchild, member of the Kansas House of Representatives
David Hahn, Nebraska politician
 Lorene Harrison, musician, educator
 Waldo McBurney, centenarian (transferred to K-State after two years)
 Windell Middlebrooks, actor
 Osman Mendez, professional soccer player
 Joshua Svaty, Kansas politician

References

External links

 
 Sterling Athletics website

 
Educational institutions established in 1887
Education in Rice County, Kansas
Buildings and structures in Rice County, Kansas
1887 establishments in Kansas
Council for Christian Colleges and Universities
Universities and colleges affiliated with the Presbyterian Church (USA)
Private universities and colleges in Kansas